Haarby or Hårby is a town in central Denmark with a population of 2,464 (1 January 2022). The town is located in Assens municipality, Syddanmark Region on the island of Funen. Until 1 January 2007 it was also the site of the municipality council of the former Haarby municipality.

Notable people 
 Uffe Ellemann-Jensen (born 1941 in Haarby) politician, Minister of Foreign Affairs (Denmark) 1982–1993.

References

External links
 Assens municipality
 Images of Haarby

Cities and towns in the Region of Southern Denmark
Populated places in Funen
Assens Municipality